Kalaallisut may refer to:
 Greenlandic language
 West Greenlandic